Jure Lenarčič (born 4 April 1990) is a Slovenian slalom canoeist who has competed at the international level since 2006.

He won a bronze medal in the C1 team event at the 2015 ICF Canoe Slalom World Championships in London. He also won a gold medal in the same event at the 2020 European Championships in Prague.

References

External links 

 Jure LENARCIC at CanoeSlalom.net

Living people
Slovenian male canoeists
1990 births
Medalists at the ICF Canoe Slalom World Championships